Karl Ivan Bergström (10 March 1937 – 10 May 2018) was a Swedish welterweight boxer. He competed at the 1960 Summer Olympics, but was eliminated in the his first bout of the tournament (the Round of 32), losing a 0-5 decision to Joseph Lartey of Ghana.

1960 Olympic results
Below is the record of Karl Bergström, a Swedish welterweight boxer who competed at the 1960 Rome Olympics:

 Round of 64: bye
 Round of 32: lost to Joseph Lartey (Ghana) by decision, 0-5

References

1937 births
2018 deaths
Boxers at the 1960 Summer Olympics
Olympic boxers of Sweden
Swedish male boxers
Welterweight boxers
People from Ångermanland
20th-century Swedish people